Cadena Capriles is a Venezuelan media company that owns the newspapers Últimas Noticias and El Mundo. Últimas Noticias is the highest selling daily newspaper in Venezuela.

History
It was founded by Miguel Ángel Capriles Ayala in 1941 with the creation of Últimas Noticias,  after the measures implemented by Venezuelan President Medina Angarita loosened restrictions on Venezuelan media. In 1956, Capriles Ayala acquired the newspaper La Esfera, which was sold in 1966. On February 3, 1958, he founded the evening newspaper El Mundo.

In 1959 he bought the magazine Élite; 1962 he acquired the magazines Venezuela Gráfica and Página (the latter of which folded in 1999); in 1966 he founded Diario Crítica in Maracaibo, which closed in 1990; in 1968 he founded the Suplemento Cultural to Últimas Noticias; in 1969 he founded the sports daily Extra (which folded a year later). In 1970 he founded Dominical, the Sunday magazine of Últimas Noticias, and the magazin Hipódromo; in 1972 he bought Kena (folded in 1999) and founded Kabala (folded in 1999) and Alarma (folded in 1973); in 1974 he founded the Maracaibo newspaper El Vespertino, which folded in 1982; in 1988 he founded Guía Hípica, which folded in 2007.

Following the death of Capriles Ayala in 1996 taken over in 1998 by his son, Miguel Ángel Capriles López. Towards the end of the twentieth century Cadena Capriles was (along with Bloque De Armas) one of the two largest producers of Venezuelan magazines, including current affairs journal Élite and the women's magazines Páginas and Kena.

In 2005 La Cadena Capriles acquired URBE and founded the sports publication Líder and Urbe Bikini; in 2009, it transformed El Mundo, a 50 year old evening general information paper into  El Mundo Economía y Negocios. Other media enterprises that were recently owned by La Cadena Capriles include La Cadena Multicolor and PlanetaurbeTV.

2013 sale
On 31 May 2013, Cadena Capriles was sold to an unknown party and commentary in its newspapers criticizing the Venezuelan government declined. This was supposedly due to the new owners of the company being close to the Venezuelan government. It was alleged that Cadena Capriles was purchased by the "chavista banker", Victor Vargas.

Following alleged censorship in favor of the Venezuelan government by the director of Últimas Noticias during the 2014 Venezuelan protests, Chief Researcher Tamoa Calzadilla, Media VP Nathalie Alvaray along with others resigned. In only a year, more than 120 journalists resigned or were fired.

References

Mass media companies of Venezuela
Venezuelan brands
Companies based in Caracas